The York Handmade Brick Company is a specialist brickmaker based in the village of Alne, North Yorkshire, England. The company was founded in 1988 from a previous brickmaking venture on the same site and has won many awards for projects that its bricks have been used in, and has supplied bricks for several notable buildings throughout the United Kingdom.

History
A company named either Alne Brickwork Co. or Alnebrick had been operating on the site at Alne since the 1930s when it was bought in 1988 by David Armitage, who retains the chairmanship, though his son runs the day-to-day business. The brickworks is located in Forest Lane, Alne, and was also formerly a pipeworks with excellent clay resources on site which had been utilised for brick-making since the 1930s. Up until 1986, a narrow-gauge  brickworks railway also operated on the site conveying quarried clay to the working sheds.

In the financial year 2018-2019, the company turnover was £2.5 million and it had 30 employees.

Besides having its bricks used in buildings such as The Shard and  railway station, the company's London Yellow bricks are also used for housebuilding in the Greater London area, which saw York Handmade produce over 130,000 bricks for this market. A contract in 2010 to supply 400,000 bricks for Chetham's School of Music was valued at over £500,000. 

The company have also supplied bricks for repairing bridges over the River Swale in North Yorkshire, larger bricks to repair the city walls of Rostok in Germany and they have also been exported to America and Japan. One of their most expensive brick creations was for the One Molyneux Street housing complex in Marylebone in London. Each brick cost £793, with 116,000 being used in the construction. According to one property journalist, the bricks are the second most expensive ever created.

In 2012, the company was featured in an episode of the Guy Martin fronted programme How Britain Worked. The team at York Handmade helped Martin create a brick in an episode entitled Coal. In 2014, the company was asked to supply 47,000 bricks for a restoration project at Dumfries House in Ayrshire. The bricks themselves resembled the ones used at Hampton Court Palace and were designed by Prince Charles.

Significant projects
2009 – Highbury Stadium, 20,000 bricks
2010 – Chetham's School of Music in Manchester, 400,000 bricks
2010 – North York Moors Railway new visitor centre at  railway station, 18,000 bricks
2011 – The Shard, 70,000 bricks
2013 – Jack Berry's House, a rehabilitation centre for injured jockeys in Malton, North Yorkshire, 50,000 bricks
2014 – York Racecourse, 80,000 bricks
2017 – Central Library in Halifax, 30,000 bricks
2017 – Turweston Airfield air traffic control centre in Buckinghamshire, 100,000 bricks
2018 – Pocklington School (Art & Design Technology Centre) 31,000 bricks
2018 - St Bride's Church, East Kilbride, 12,000 bricks
2019 –  railway station (and London Bridge Palace), 200,000 bricks
2019 – One Molyneux Street Marylebone, 116,000 bricks
2019 - St Albans Cathedral, 30,000 specialist bricks
2019 – Jesus College, Cambridge, 20,000 specialist bricks to renovate the Porter's Lodge in the college

Awards
1995 - Supreme Brick Building award for St Bridget's Church in Belfast
2005 - Brick Development Association award for work on the walled garden at Scampston Hall, near Malton
2015 - Brick Awards (best outdoor space) Belvedere and Queen Elizabeth Walled Garden at Dumfries House in Scotland

References

Brick manufacturers
British companies established in 1988
Companies based in Hambleton District
Manufacturing companies established in 1988
1988 establishments in England
Building materials companies of the United Kingdom
Companies based in York